Cosmos (subtitled The Science of Everything) is a science magazine published in Adelaide, South Australia, by the Royal Institution of Australia that covers science globally. It appears four times a year in print as Cosmos Magazine, and the online edition is updated daily with news as well as long features and multi-media content, and includes the print magazine content. Cosmos Weekly is a subscription-based weekly online edition published on Fridays, and a podcast was launched in April 2022.

History
The magazine was established in Sydney in November 2004 by the Sydney magazine publishing executive Kylie Ahern and science journalist Wilson da Silva. with the first issue published in 2005.

In June 2006, the magazine launched a daily Internet news and features service.

The magazine was the originator of Hello from Earth, a web-based initiative to send messages from the public, each just 160 characters in length, to Gliese 581d, the (then) nearest Earth-like planet outside the Solar System. Created as a science communication exercise for 2009 National Science Week in Australia, it collected nearly 26,000 messages that were beamed by NASA's Canberra Deep Space Communication Complex on 28 August 2009.

In June 2013 the company, then owned by Luna Media, moved to Melbourne following its acquisition in February 2013 by Australia's Chief Scientist, Alan Finkel, and his wife Elizabeth Finkel, a science journalist, who became editor-in-chief. The Finkels were already part-owners, and acquired the remainder from Ahern and Da Silva, who remained on the editorial staff. 

On 1 September 2018, custodianship of the magazine was transferred to Royal Institution of Australia (RiAus), a not-for-profit science media organisation based in Adelaide.
In April 2021 Cosmos Weekly was launched, and exactly a year later, a podcast on the LiSTNR app, featuring science explainers, was launched.

Writers whose work have featured include Margaret Wertheim, Jared Diamond, Tim Flannery, Richard Dawkins, Edward O. Wilson, Michio Kaku, Susan Greenfield, Steven Pinker, Paul Davies, Simon Singh and Oliver Sacks.

Description
Cosmos''' subtitle and byline is "The Science of Everything". The quarterly print magazine, Cosmos Magazine, is a science magazine published in Adelaide by RiAus, covering international developments in science. The online edition is updated daily with news as well as long features and multi-media content, and includes the print magazine content. Cosmos Weekly is a subscription-based weekly online edition published on Fridays.

In the 12 months to March 2022, the print readership of Cosmos had increased 115.1% on the previous year, lifting it to 114,000.

People
Ian Connellan is editor-in-chief of RiAus, while Gail MacCallum is managing editor of Cosmos Magazine.

Recognition and awardsCosmos Magazine'' won 48 journalism and industry awards under Da Silva's editorship, including Magazine of the Year at the Bell Awards for Publishing Excellence in 2009 and 2006, and Editor of the Year in 2006 and 2005. 

It won a Reuters/World Conservation Union Award for Excellence in Environmental Reporting, an Earth Journalism Award and the American Institute of Physics Science Writing Award.

References

External links

2004 establishments in Australia
Magazines published in Australia
Science and technology magazines
Quarterly magazines published in Australia
Magazines established in 2004
Magazines published in Sydney
Magazines published in Melbourne
Popular science magazines
Mass media in Adelaide